The eleventh season of the American competitive television series BattleBots premiered on Discovery Channel on January 6, 2022. This is the fourth season of Battlebots to premiere on Discovery Channel and the sixth season since the show was rebooted in 2015. The show continued to use their modified logo, with a pair of "B"'s, making a "BB" logo atop the term "BATTLEBOTS", as well as the subtitle, "Fight Night" for qualifying rounds.

MLB/NFL Sportscaster Chris Rose and former UFC fighter Kenny Florian return to host for the eleventh season, as well as arena announcer Faruq Tauheed and "Bot Whisperer" Pete Abrahamson.

Brand new this season, in the ever evolving sport of combat robotics, the BattleBox changes with the inclusion of an "upper deck", complete with its own set of spinning saw blades, totally adds new geometry angles to the playing surface.

Also new for this season, BattleBots has changed locations from Los Angeles, California to Las Vegas, Nevada, now known as "The Fight Capital of the World".

Filming
The matches took place between Monday, August 23rd, 2021, culminating on September 4th, 2021.  Qualifying fights took place on the 23rd, 24th, 27th, and 28th, with two fight cards each day from 12PM-4PM and 6PM-10PM.  Tournament rounds took place on the 29th and 31st of August, and the 2nd, 3rd, and 4th of September.  As with the qualifying rounds, there were two rounds of fights each day at the same times as the qualifiers.

Caesars Entertainment Studios, at 4165 Koval Lane, was the new venue for the battlebox and the pits.  Previously, competitions had taken place in the former Boeing Post 52 building at the Long Beach Airport.

Judges
This season, the judges score on an 11-point scale: 5 points for damage; 3 points for aggression; and 3 points for control.

The current judges are: former BattleBots contenders, Derek Young, Lisa Winter, and Jason Bardis.

Contestants
This season marked the 22nd year of the BattleBots competition. The lineup features 62 of the best heavyweight robots to fight head-to-head in the Battle Arena.

Every team will fight up to three times in the qualifying rounds. Their goal is to earn a spot in the top 32 in the winner-take-all championship tournament and ultimately become the 2021 BattleBots World Champion.

Seeding
End Game (3-0)
Ribbot (3-0)
Whiplash (2-0)
Sawblaze (2-1)
Uppercut (2-0)
Rotator (2-0)
Blip (3-0)
Copperhead (2-0)
Mammoth (1-2)  * In replacement For Glitch 
Jackpot (2-0)  (Home Team) 
Tantrum (2-0)
Shatter! (2-0)
Hypershock (2-0)
Cobalt (2-1)
Madcatter (2-1)
Minotaur (2-1)
Bloodsport (2-1)
Black Dragon(2-1)
Yeti (2-1)
P1 (2-1)
Riptide (2-1)
Gigabyte (2-1)
Tombstone (2-1)
Witch Doctor (2-1)
Lucky (2-1)
Valkyrie (2-1)
Captain Shrederator (2-1)
HUGE (2-1)
HiJinx (2-1)
Icewave (2-1)
Hydra (1-2) vs. Defender (2-1)
Skorpios (1-2) vs. Malice  (1-2)

Tournament bracket

Play in Stages

Knockout stage

Notes
'* Glitch was the #9 seed set to fight Witch Doctor but had to withdraw due to mechanical issues.

Episodes

References

BattleBots